The 1939–40 Holy Cross Crusaders men's basketball team represented The College of the Holy Cross during the 1939–40 college men's basketball season. The head coach was Ed Krause, coaching the crusaders in his first season.

Schedule

|-

References

Holy Cross Crusaders men's basketball seasons
Holy Cross